Claria Denise Horn Boom (born 1969) is a United States district judge of the United States District Court for the Eastern District of Kentucky and United States District Court for the Western District of Kentucky. She is a member of the United States Sentencing Commission.

Education and career 
Boom earned her Bachelor of Arts degree from Transylvania University and her Juris Doctor from the Vanderbilt University Law School. She clerked for Judge Pierce Lively of the United States Court of Appeals for the Sixth Circuit. Early in her career she was an Assistant United States Attorney in the Eastern and Western Districts of Kentucky, and before that, practiced at King & Spalding in Atlanta, Georgia. Before becoming a judge, she practiced as a partner at Frost Brown Todd in the Lexington office.

Federal judicial service 
On June 7, 2017, President Donald Trump announced his intent to nominate Boom to serve as a United States District Judge of the United States District Court for the Eastern District of Kentucky and of the United States District Court for the Western District of Kentucky, to the joint seat vacated by Judge Jennifer B. Coffman. On June 12, 2017, her nomination was sent to the Senate. Boom received a "qualified" rating from the American Bar Association. A hearing on her nomination before the Senate Judiciary Committee took place on November 15, 2017. On December 7, 2017, her nomination was reported out of committee by voice vote. On April 9, 2018, the United States Senate voted to invoke cloture on her nomination by a 96–2 vote. On April 10, 2018, her nomination was confirmed by a 96–1 vote. She received her commission on April 11, 2018. She maintains chambers in London, Kentucky for the Eastern District and Louisville, Kentucky for the Western District.

United States Sentencing Commission

Intent to nominate under Trump 
On August 12, 2020, President Donald Trump announced his intent to nominate Boom to serve as a Commissioner of the United States Sentencing Commission.

Nomination under Biden 
On May 11, 2022, President Joe Biden announced his intent to nominate Boom to serve as a member of the United States Sentencing Commission. On May 12, 2022, her nomination was sent to the Senate, she has been nominated to fill the position left vacant by Judge William H. Pryor, whose term expired. On June 8, 2022, a hearing on her nomination was held before the Senate Judiciary Committee. On July 21, 2022, her nomination was reported out of committee by a voice vote. On August 4, 2022, the United States Senate confirmed her nomination by a voice vote.

Personal life 
Boom grew up in Martin County, Kentucky, where her mother served as clerk of the court. In 2013, she married Denny Boom, who is the president of a Lexington construction company.

References

External links 
 
 
 Biography at U.S. District Court for the Eastern District of Kentucky

1969 births
Living people
20th-century American lawyers
20th-century American women lawyers
21st-century American lawyers
21st-century American women lawyers
21st-century American judges
21st-century American women judges
Assistant United States Attorneys
Judges of the United States District Court for the Eastern District of Kentucky
Judges of the United States District Court for the Western District of Kentucky
Kentucky lawyers
Members of the United States Sentencing Commission
People from Ashland, Kentucky
People from Marion County, Kentucky
Transylvania University alumni
United States district court judges appointed by Donald Trump
Vanderbilt University Law School alumni